"Energy" is the second single by Canadian rapper Drake from his commercial mixtape If You're Reading This It's Too Late on February 13, 2015.

Composition

"Energy" contains samples from Eazy-Duz-It performed by Eazy-E and Ridin Spinners performed by Three 6 Mafia. The song also samples the hook from the Hot Boys song I Need A Hot Girl, as well as the instrumental from the Original Concept song Knowledge Me. Energy was produced by Boi-1da and OB O'Brien. According to WhoSampled the song samples the score of an episode of The O.C.. The very first sample is believed to be of Jamaican DJ Jah Walton, likely recorded at a sound clash contest.

Critical reception
Ryan Dombal of Pitchfork gave the song a positive review and named it "best new track", stating "The song isn't aimed to any rappers or pop stars, not Kendrick Lamar, Big Sean or Tyga, but the song lines are dangerous." Album Of The Year stated that the song became the most famous single to come out of If You're Reading This It's Too Late.

Music video

Release
The video of "Energy" was released on Apple Music and users with iTunes and registered Apple Music account can watch this video.

Synopsis
The music video for "Energy" features Drake transformed into several notable celebrities, including: television personality Oprah Winfrey, during her famous interview with Tom Cruise; professional boxer Floyd Mayweather Jr.; singer Justin Bieber, from a Calvin Klein advertisement; singer Miley Cyrus, from her own music video for "Wrecking Ball"; former mayor of Toronto, Rob Ford, enjoying crack cocaine in an alley; entertainer Kanye West, during the filming of his own music video for "Bound 2"; United States President Barack Obama, during a presidential address; NBA player LeBron James; and O. J. Simpson, during the high speed car chase that led to his arrest. In each of these iterations, Drake mimes along with the song. Interspersed with these clips is monochromatic footage of Drake and his entourage; along with portraits of other caricatures. Bookending the video, a child version of Drake is seen in a field with other children, who act not unlike bullies towards him. At the end of the video, the young Drake stands solitary in the field, while another child (who has now been revealed to have Drake's adult face) points a toy gun at him.

Reception
Many critics stated that Drake uses this video to mock Justin Bieber, Miley Cyrus, Kanye West and many other celebrities in the video. However, each usage of a notable person is timed to emphasize a certain lyric within the song. None of the personalities parodied in the footage have publicly responded to the video for "Energy". Pitchfork Media named "Energy" the 12th best music video of 2015.

Commercial performance
In Canada, "Energy" peaked at number 65 on the Billboard Canadian Hot 100. In the United States, it is the highest-charting song from the album to date, reaching number 26 on the Billboard Hot 100, number 9 on the Billboard Hot R&B/Hip Hop Songs chart and number 5 on the Billboard Rap chart. "Energy" also peaked at number 71 on the UK Singles Chart.

Charts

Certifications

References

External links
 Lyrics of Energy by Drake on Genius
 

2015 singles
2015 songs
Cash Money Records singles
Drake (musician) songs
Songs written by Drake (musician)
Songs written by Boi-1da
Song recordings produced by Boi-1da